Platyptilia romieuxi is a moth of the family Pterophoridae. It is found in the Haut-Katanga District of the Democratic Republic of the Congo.

References

Moths described in 2009
romieuxi
Endemic fauna of the Democratic Republic of the Congo
Insects of the Democratic Republic of the Congo
Moths of Africa